Indium(III) chloride is the chemical compound with the formula InCl3. This salt  is a white, flaky solid with applications in organic synthesis as a Lewis acid.  It is also the most available soluble derivative of indium.

Synthesis and structure
Being a relatively electropositive metal, indium reacts quickly with chlorine to give the trichloride.  Indium trichloride is very soluble and deliquescent. A synthesis has been reported using an electrochemical cell in a mixed methanol-benzene solution.

Like AlCl3 and TlCl3, InCl3 crystallizes as a layered structure consisting of a close-packed chloride arrangement containing layers of octahedrally coordinated In(III) centers, a structure akin to that seen in YCl3.  In contrast, GaCl3 crystallizes as  dimers containing Ga2Cl6. Molten InCl3 conducts electricity, whereas AlCl3 does not as it converts to the molecular dimer, Al2Cl6.

Reactions
InCl3 is a Lewis acid and forms complexes with donor ligands, L, InCl3L, InCl3L2, InCl3L3. For example, with the chloride ion it forms tetrahedral InCl4−, trigonal bipyramidal InCl52−, and octahedral InCl63−.

In diethyl ether solution, InCl3 reacts with lithium hydride, LiH, to form LiInH4. This unstable compound decomposes below 0 °C, and is reacted in situ in organic synthesis as a reducing agent and to prepare tertiary amine and phosphine complexes of InH3.

Trimethylindium, InMe3, can be produced by reacting InCl3 in diethyl ether solution either with the Grignard reagent MeMgI or methyllithium, LiMe. Triethylindium can be prepared in a similar fashion but with the grignard reagent EtMgBr.

{InCl3} + 3LiMe -> {Me3In.OEt2} + 3LiCl
{InCl3} + 3MeMgI -> {Me3In.OEt2} + 3MgClI
{InCl3} + 3EtMgBr -> {Et3In.OEt2} + 3MgBr2

InCl3 reacts with indium metal at high temperature to form the lower valent indium chlorides In5Cl9, In2Cl3 and InCl.

Catalyst in chemistry
Indium chloride is a Lewis acid catalyst in organic reactions such as Friedel-Crafts acylations and Diels-Alder reactions. As an example of the latter, the reaction proceeds at room temperature, with 1 mole% catalyst loading in an acetonitrile-water solvent mixture. The first step is a Knoevenagel condensation between the barbituric acid and the aldehyde; the second step is a reverse electron-demand Diels-Alder reaction, which is a multicomponent reaction of N,N'-dimethyl-barbituric acid, benzaldehyde and ethyl vinyl ether. With the catalyst, the reported chemical yield is 90% and the percentage trans isomer is 70%. Without the catalyst added, the yield drops to 65% with 50% trans product.

References

Chlorides
Metal halides
Indium compounds